The  is a Japanese sobriquet describing four highly effective samurai generals who fought on behalf of Tokugawa Ieyasu in Sengoku period. They were famous during their lifetimes as the four most fiercely loyal vassals of the Tokugawa clan in the early Edo period.

Etymology
The sobriquet evolved from the "Four Heavenly Kings" of Buddhist iconography. These are said to be the guardians of the four horizons.

Fudai leaders
Each of these four generals was the founder of a cadet branch clan:
Honda Tadakatsu of the Honda clan
Ii Naomasa of the Ii clan
Sakakibara Yasumasa of the Sakakibara clan
Sakai Tadatsugu of the Sakai clan

Tokugawa Four Gallery

See also 
 Shitennō (samurai)
 Shitennō-ji
 Kōdōkan Shitennō

Notes

References
 Appert, Georges and H. Kinoshita. (1888).  Ancien Japon. Tokyo: Imprimerie Kokubunsha. OCLC 4429674
 Nussbaum, Louis Frédéric and Käthe Roth. (2005). Japan Encyclopedia. Cambridge: Harvard University Press. ; OCLC 48943301

Further reading
 Bolitho, Harold. (1974). Treasures Among Men: The Fudai Daimyo in Tokugawa Japan. New Haven: Yale University Press. ;  OCLC 185685588

Samurai
Tokugawa clan